Olabisi Oreofe Ugbebor  (née Grace Olabisi Falode, born 29 January 1951) is the first female professor in mathematics in Nigeria. Born in Lagos, she studied mathematics at the University of Ibadan and then at the University of London, where she obtained a PhD in 1976.

Education and academic career 
Born in Lagos, Ugbebor had her secondary education at Queen's College, Lagos. She completed her first degree in Mathematics from University of Ibadan in 1972. In 1973, she had a postgraduate diploma in statistics at University College London, before completing her thesis on Sample Path Properties of Brownian Motion (1976) at the age of 25. While at Unibadan, she was the only female student in her class. She is also the first Nigerian woman to get a PhD and become a professor in Mathematics. In 2017, she was made a Fellow of the Mathematics Association of Nigeria.

Publications 

 He’s Polynomials for Analytical Solutions of the Black-Scholes Pricing Model for Stock Option Valuation
 The modified Black-Scholes model via constant elasticity of variance for stock options valuation
 Analytical Solutions of a Continuous Arithmetic Asian Model for Option Pricing using Projected Differential Transform Method
 Fast Fourier Transform of Multi-Assets Options under Economic Recession Induced Uncertainties
 Approximate solutions of a variable volatility driven black-scholes option pricing model
 CONSTRUCTION OF ANALYTICAL SOLUTIONS TO THE BLACK-SCHOLES OPTION VALUATION MODEL BY MEANS OF HE’S POLYNOMIALS TECHNIQUE\
 Analytical solutions of a time-fractional nonlinear transaction-cost model for stock option valuation in an illiquid market setting driven by a relaxed Black-Scholes assumption

Membership of learned societies 
Reciprocity Member, London Mathematical Society
Member, Nigerian Mathematical Society
Member, Mathematics Association of Nigeria.
Member, African Economic Society.
Member, Bernoulli Society for Mathematical Statistics and Probability(1988-1992) 
Member, Third World Organisation of Women in Science, Italy, 1993-date.

References

External links
Home page

https://www.researchgate.net/scientific-contributions/OO-Ugbebor-2087991282

1951 births
Scientists from Lagos
Nigerian women academics
20th-century Nigerian mathematicians
Women mathematicians
University of Ibadan alumni
Academic staff of the University of Ibadan
Alumni of the University of London
Living people
21st-century Nigerian mathematicians